Beaver Lake is a lake in Alberta, Canada. It is located just southeast of the hamlet of Lac La Biche, Alberta. It is the source of Beaver River whose waters flow east to Hudson Bay. Just  to the north-west of Beaver Lake is the much larger Lac la Biche, which drains north to the Arctic Ocean.

See also
List of lakes in Alberta

References

Lac La Biche County
Lakes of Alberta